Pseudathyma jacksoni is a butterfly in the family Nymphalidae. It is found in Kenya and the Democratic Republic of the Congo.

Subspecies
Pseudathyma jacksoni jacksoni (Kenya)
Pseudathyma jacksoni kivuensis Libert, 2002 (Democratic Republic of the Congo)

References

Butterflies described in 1965
Pseudathyma